EMS Technologies was an Atlanta-based company with approximately $290 million in annual sales revenue before its 2011 purchase by Honeywell International. EMS-T specialized in wireless, defense, and space communications systems.

History
Founded  in 1968 by Dr. John E. Pippin (1928–2007) as Electromagnetic Sciences Inc., the company was located in the Peachtree Corners Technology Park and employed about 1,100 there and 1,900 internationally. In 2007, EMS had its best financial results of its 40-year history, acquiring two companies, DSpace of Australia, and Akerstroms of Sweden, and earning a listing on Forbes magazine's list of the 200 best small companies. Among its products, it offered electronic counter-countermeasures for communications satellites, and airborne communications, for which it held a 90% stake in military applications, such as Air Force One.

EMS was purchased by Honeywell International in August 2011.

Divisions
The company had four major divisions: EMS Defense & Space, LXE, EMS Aviation and EMS Global Tracking.

EMS Defense & Space
EMS Defense & Space manufactured Kband antenna systems and custom beam management systems for military and commercial applications, including mobile network-centric operations, radar for battlefield visibility and commercial aero connectivity.

EMS Global Tracking
EMS Global Tracking manufactured vehicle and personal tracking systems for transportation, security, maritime and the oil and gas industries.  This division helped companies locate, track and communicate with mobile assets, safeguard their fleets, cargo.

EMS Aviation
EMS Aviation manufactured satellite-based communication systems that enable worldwide high-speed Internet, voice and video capabilities in-flight. This division's systems are used for in-flight communications and entertainment, rugged data storage, airborne connectivity, and data recording and replay hardware and software for the aerospace, defense and transportation industries.

LXE
LXE manufactured rugged vehicle-mounted, handheld and wearable mobile computers. This division's warehouse products helped companies extend corporate networks to mobile workers with hand held scanners and computers.

References

Companies formerly listed on the Nasdaq
Electronics companies established in 1968
Companies based in Atlanta
Electronics companies of the United States
1968 establishments in Georgia (U.S. state)
2011 mergers and acquisitions
Electronics companies disestablished in 2011
2011 disestablishments in Georgia (U.S. state)
Honeywell